Jane Donnelly is a British writer. During period of 1965 to 2000, she wrote more than 60 romance novels from Mills & Boon. Her novels are characterized as "happy escapist reading".

Bibliography

Single novels
Don't Look Back (1965)
A Man Apart (1968)
Don't Walk Alone (1968)
This Hell Called Love (1969)
Shadows from the Sea (1969)
Whispering Ones (1969)
Stranger in the Dark (1969)
Take the Far Dream (1970)
Man in the Next Room (1970)
Never Turn Back (1970)
Half Way to the Stars (1971)
Mill in the Meadow (1972)
Stranger Came (1972)
The Long Shadow (1973)
Rocks Under Shining Water (1973)
Man Called Mallory (1974)
Collision Course (1975)
The Man Outside (1975)
Ride Out the Storm (1975)
Dark Pursuer (1976)
Silver Cage (1976)
The Intruder (1976)
Four Weeks in Winter (1977)
Dear Caliban (1977)
Touched by Fire (1977)
Black Hunter (1978)
Love for a Stranger (1978)
Spell of the Seven Stones (1978)
Forest of the Night (1978)
Behind a Closed Door (1979)
A Savage Sanctuary (1979)
A Man to Watch (1979)
No Way Out (1980)
When Lightning Strikes (1980)
So Long a Winter (1981)
Flashpoint (1981)
Frozen Jungle (1981)
Diamond Cut Diamond (1982)
Call Up the Storm (1983)
Face the Tiger (1983)
A Fierce Encounter (1983)
Moon Lady (1984)
Ring of Crystal (1985)
To Cage a Whirlwind (1985)
Ride a Wild Horse (1986)
Force Field (1987)
No Place to Run (1987)
Fetters of Gold (1988)
When We're Alone (1989)
The Jewels of Helen (1990)
Devil's Flower (1990)
Once a Cheat (1991)
The Trespasser (1992)
Hold Back the Dark (1993)
Shadow of a Tiger (1994)
Cover Story (1994)
Sleeping Beauty (1995)
Living with Marc (1996)
Max's Proposal (1998)
A Very Private Man (1999)
Fiance for Real (2000)

Collections
The First Anthology of Three Harlequin Romances by Jane Donnelly (1982)

Omnibus in collaboration
Dear Caliban / Heart of the Eagle / Swans' Reach (1978) (with Elizabeth Graham and Margaret Way)
The Man Outside / Castles in Spain / McCabe's Kingdom (1979) (with Rebecca Stratton and Margaret Way)
Parade of Peacocks / Never Turn Back / Pirate of the Sun (1979) (with Elizabeth Ashton and Gwen Westwood)
Desert Castle / Collision Course / Ride A Black Horse (1980) (with Isobel Chace and Margaret Pargeter)
The Shifting Sands / Portrait of Jaime / Touched by Fire (1982) (with Kay Thorpe and Margaret Way)
Intruder / Love's Puppet / Devil's Gateway (1983) (with Henrietta Reid and Yvonne Whittal)
The Master Fiddler / Forest of the Night / Rightful Possession (1988) (with Janet Dailey and Sally Wentworth)

References

External links
Jane Donnelly's Webpage in Fantastic Fiction's Website
Harlequin Enterprises Ltd's Website

English women novelists
English romantic fiction writers
Women romantic fiction writers
Living people
Year of birth missing (living people)
20th-century British novelists
20th-century British women writers